Alfés is a village in the province of Lleida and autonomous community of Catalonia, Spain.

Local politics
In 2007-2011 a Belgian resident, Ann Gyles, from the Republican Left of Catalonia, became mayor of Alfés. She had already been adjunct mayor in 2003–2007.

References

External links
 Government data pages 

Municipalities in Segrià